Balneicella is a Gram-negative, mesophilic, anaerobic non-spore-forming and non-motile genus of bacteria from the family of Balneicellaceae with on known species (Balneicella halophila).

References

Bacteroidia
Bacteria genera
Monotypic bacteria genera